Boston Township is one of fifteen townships in Wayne County, Indiana, United States. As of the 2010 census, its population was 887 and it contained 404 housing units.

History
Boston Township was formed in 1835.

Geography
The streams of Boston Creek, Cream Run, Lick Creek and Tea Creek run through this township.

Cities and towns
 Richmond (Municipal Airport)
 Boston

Unincorporated towns
 Locust Grove at 
(This list is based on USGS data and may include former settlements.)

Cemeteries
The township contains at least two cemeteries, Glen Haven Memorial Gardens and Elkhorn Cemetery.  There are also a couple of small burial grounds in the southern part of the township.

Major highways
 U.S. Route 27
 Indiana State Road 227

Airports and landing strips
 Richmond Municipal Airport

References
 
 United States Census Bureau cartographic boundary files

External links
 Indiana Township Association
 United Township Association of Indiana

Townships in Wayne County, Indiana
Townships in Indiana